Boynton is an unincorporated community in Catoosa County, in the U.S. state of Georgia.

History
Boynton was originally called "Peavine", and under the latter name, the first permanent settlement was made in 1850. A post office called Boynton was in operation from 1890 until 1903. The community was named for Henry V. Boynton, who helped establish nearby Chickamauga and Chattanooga National Military Park.

References

Unincorporated communities in Catoosa County, Georgia
Unincorporated communities in Georgia (U.S. state)